Cynfarch Oer ('Cynfarch the Dismal', also known as Cunomarcus or Cynfarch ap Meirchion) was probably a 6th-century king of the Sub-Roman realm of Rheged, believed to be located in north-west England and south-west Scotland.

Next to nothing is known about Cynfarch. He appears in the Old Welsh pedigrees of the Brythonic 'Men of the North' as the son of the equally obscure Meirchion Gul (Marcianus the Lean) and father of the better documented Urien Rheged. The epithet "Oer" is literally translated as 'cold', but may be understood in unflattering terms as 'Cynfarch the unwelcoming'. Cynfach was however, well remembered by his own descendents who were referred to as the 'Cynferchyn' in his honour.

References

Monarchs of Rheged
6th-century English monarchs
6th-century Scottish monarchs
6th-century English people
6th-century Scottish people